Toffo was a British brand of toffee, produced by Mackintosh's. They came individually wrapped, in a roll, and were available in plain, mint, and assorted (apple, strawberry, pineapple, banana, and mint) flavours. It was one of its main brands along with Polo, Quality Street, Toffee Crisp, Fox's Glacier Mints, and Caramac. Its original advertising slogan was "a man’s gotta chew what a man’s gotta chew". Production was taken over by Rowntree Mackintosh Confectionery after Rowntree's merged with Mackintosh's in 1969.

Toffo was discontinued in 2005 before being resurrected by Nestlé, in a small 19.2g tube, produced in the United Arab Emirates.

References

Food brands of the United Kingdom
Defunct brands
British confectionery
Nestlé brands
Rowntree's brands
Toffee